Bad Girls Road Trip is an American reality television series which aired on Oxygen from June 12, 2007, to July 24, 2007. It is the first spin-off of Bad Girls Club. Bad Girls Road Trip stars season one alumni Zara Sprankle, Aimee Landi, and Leslie Ramsue, who tour their respective hometowns, search for casting opportunities for the second season of Bad Girls Club as well as visiting some of their former housemates.

Cast

Main
Zara Sprankle is one of the original Bad Girls and one of the three to make it the whole season. She was known for several dramatic episodes.
Leslie Ramsue is one of the original Bad Girls. She didn't make it the whole season, but was seen in the season one finale of the show. She was known for her career as a stripper as well as her friendship with housemate Ty.
Aimee Landi is one of the original Bad Girls and like Zara, was one of the three to make it the whole season.

Guest
DeAnn appeared in the first episode of Road Trip along with Kerry. DeAnn moved in the Bad Girls House after Ripsi was kicked out.
Kerry Harvick appeared in episode one of Road Trip. Kerry is known for being very sneaky and catty, like Zara and Aimee lasted the whole season of The Bad Girls Club.
Jodie appeared in the third and fourth episode of Road Trip. Jodie left the show without letting anyone know except for Joanna, so she had to explain why she left right before the finale.
Joanna came on the Road Trip in fifth episode and after being ditched at the end of episode five, they found their roommates again in episode six. One of the 'replacement' Bad Girls, she came in after Ty left the show.
Andrea along with Joanna came on Road Trip in episode five and six. She is also one of the 'replacement' Bad Girls, she came in after Leslie left on her own terms.
Ripsi joined her roommates for the Road Trip in episode six, the season finale.

Episodes

References

External links
 

2000s American reality television series
2007 American television series debuts
2007 American television series endings
American television spin-offs
English-language television shows
Television series by Bunim/Murray Productions
Bad Girls Club
Reality television spin-offs
Oxygen (TV channel) original programming
Television shows set in the United States